The Latin American Youth Table Tennis Championships currently includes two categories: cadets (under 15) and juniors (under 18). 

Currently, the championships include boys' team, girls' team, boys' singles, girls' singles, boys' doubles, girls' doubles and mixed doubles events for juniors and cadets. There are also consolation events for players defeated in the qualifying
stages and in the first round of the singles events.

The final ranking of the junior boys' and girls' team events determines the qualification for the same year's World Junior Championships.

Junior Results

Cadet Results

See also
 Table tennis
 Latin American Table Tennis Union
 World Table Tennis Championships
 List of table tennis players

References
ULTM Website

Table tennis competitions